Daniel Nestor and Leander Paes were the defending champions but chose not to participate together.  Nestor played alongside Rohan Bopanna, but they lost in the first round to Juan Sebastián Cabal and Robert Farah.  Paes teamed up with David Marrero, but they retired in the first round against Sam Groth and Chris Guccione.
Cabal and Farah won the title, defeating Jamie Murray and John Peers in the final, 6-3, 6–4.

Seeds

Draw

Draw

References
Main Draw

Winston-Salem Open - Doubles
2014 Doubles